Luigi Centurini (Genoa, April 24, 1820 – Genoa, November 10, 1900) was an Italian jurist, chess player, and chess composer.

In 1853 he published the pamphlet in Genoa titled Giuoco degli Scacchi (Game of Chess). The endgame of rook and knight against rook was a study that made him known worldwide. In 1865 he wrote a work about the "gambetto grande" (Gambit) that appeared on Eco della Scienza, but his studies especially address the endgame. He collaborated with La Régence and The Chess Monthly in 1856–57. He corresponded with the major chess theorists of his time.

Sample studies

White to move wins:
 1. Nd6 Rg8
 2. Re1 Rf8
 3. Nb7+ Kc8
 4. Rb1 Rf3
 5. Nd6+ Kd8
 6. Rb8+ Ke7
 7. Re8+ Kf6
 8. Rf8+ wins the rook by a skewer after 8...Kf6 9. Rf8+.
Black to move draws by 1...Rg1, with the idea of checking from the first rank .

Centurini was also the primary analyst of the endgame of a bishop and pawn versus a bishop on the same color . He established rules for when the position is won and when it is a draw . The position in the second diagram shows a winning position for White, although it requires accurate play .

References

 

1820 births
1900 deaths
Italian chess players
Chess composers
Italian chess writers
Sportspeople from Genoa
19th-century chess players